Paratoxodera gigliotosi is a species of praying mantis found West Malaysia. This species is often confused with Paratoxodera cornicollis as they are similar in appearance. However, their geographical distribution is noticeably different.

See also

List of mantis genera and species

References

Mantidae
Mantodea of Asia
Insects described in 2009